Music and Silence is a historical novel written by English author Rose Tremain. It is set in and around the court of Christian IV of Denmark in the years 1629 and 1630.

The book won Best Novel at the 1999 Whitbread Awards.

The main historical event depicted is the end of Christian's second marriage, to Kirsten Munk, and the start of his third, to Vibeke Kruse. There are also numerous sub-plots and parallel stories, the main one being the love affair between two fictional characters, an English lutenist Peter Claire and Emilia Tilsen, a Danish servant of Kirsten's. In addition there are several references to Danish history and flashbacks to Christian's childhood and subsequent development.

Historical novels
Novels set in Copenhagen
1999 novels
Fiction set in 1629
Fiction set in 1630
Chatto & Windus books
Novels about music
Cultural depictions of Christian IV of Denmark
Novels set in the 17th century